St. Joseph's High School is a private Catholic secondary school for boys and girls located at Umerkhadi, Mumbai, Maharashtra, Mumbai, India. It was formed in 1932 and is dedicated to St Joseph. The school motto is "Virtute et Labore" ("Virtue and Hard Work").

History
St. Joseph's started in 1875 as an elementary Portuguese school, before being changed into an English school. In 1930, the school was raised to the status of English-teaching middle school. In 1931, the school moved into the present building and in 1932, St. Joseph's became a high school.

Routine
The daily morning assembly in the school quadrangle is a prayer session.

Curriculum
The school follows the Maharashtra (SSC) board.

Recent advancements
The school has a focus on computer technology. The school has an audiovisual room where students are shown films on various subjects, to reinforce what has been taught in the classroom.

Christian schools in Maharashtra
High schools and secondary schools in Mumbai